Bernice Raspberry, also called Ed Lively, was a 23-year old African-American man who was murdered in Leakesville, Mississippi, on May 25, 1927. Raspberry was arrested for an infraction in Leakesville, but then the sheriff was told he was wanted in nearby Bothwell for "alleged improper conduct with a white woman". Raspberry was taken to Bothwell but then taken back to Leakesville, for safe keeping. A group of some 100 masked man took him from the jail, strung him to a tree, and shot him many times.

References

External links

1927 in Mississippi
1927 murders in the United States
Deaths by person in Mississippi
People murdered in Mississippi
Lynching deaths in Mississippi
May 1927 events
Racially motivated violence against African Americans
Murdered African-American people
Race-related controversies in the United States